The Main–Partition Streets Historic District is located at Saugerties in Ulster County, New York. The district includes 78 contributing buildings. It encompasses the village's central business district.  It includes a variety of two and three story, brick commercial buildings, two churches, a U.S. Post Office, three small dwellings, three 19th century brick barns, a 19th-century frame barn, and a variety of outbuildings.

It was listed on the National Register of Historic Places in 1982.

See also
National Register of Historic Places listings in Ulster County, New York

References

National Register of Historic Places in Ulster County, New York
Historic districts on the National Register of Historic Places in New York (state)
Historic districts in Ulster County, New York